Şükürlü can refer to:

 Şükürlü, Çınar, Turkey
 Şükürlü, Jalilabad, Azerbaijan